Nicholas Arbuckle (born October 4, 1993) is a professional Canadian football quarterback for the Ottawa Redblacks of the Canadian Football League (CFL). He has also been a member of the Calgary Stampeders, Ottawa Redblacks, Toronto Argonauts, and Edmonton Elks.

College career 
Arbuckle played college football at Los Angeles Pierce College and Georgia State. During his time playing for the Panthers, he was first-team All-Sunbelt Conference in 2015. Also in 2015, Arbuckle set a Sun Belt record 4,368 passing yards along with school records in completions (307) and touchdowns (28). In 2015, He also became the first Georgia State football player in school history to be named the conference player of the year.

Professional career

Pittsburgh Steelers 
After going undrafted in the 2016 NFL Draft Arbuckle spent mini-camp with the Pittsburgh Steelers of the NFL.

Calgary Stampeders 
Arbuckle signed with the Calgary Stampeders in March 2017. He quickly became the Stampeders' backup quarterback behind Bo Levi Mitchell. Arbuckle played sparingly in 2018, completing 17 of 25 pass attempts for 144 yards with one touchdown: He also ran for 5 touchdowns as a short-yardage quarterback. Arbuckle lead the Stamps to an improbable come-from-behind victory in Week 3 of the 2019 season after Bo Levi Mitchell left with a shoulder injury. Mitchell was subsequently placed on the six-game injured reserve, making Arbuckle the interim-starting quarterback. Arbuckle led the Stamps to an impressive 37-10 victory the following week over conference rivals the Saskatchewan Roughriders. The Stamps won four of their seven matches with Arbuckle under centre, before Mitchell returned to the starting lineup for the Labour Day game. He finished the season having completed 174 of 238 pass attempts (73.1%) for 2,103 yards with 11 touchdowns and five interceptions.

Ottawa Redblacks 
On January 3, 2020, Arbuckle was traded to the Ottawa Redblacks for a third-round pick and another conditional pick in the 2020 CFL Draft. After a lengthy negotiation, he re-signed with Ottawa on January 31, 2020 to a two-year contract and triggered the conditional draft pick trade that saw Ottawa and Calgary swap first-round draft picks in the 2020 draft. On January 31, 2021, only a few hours after being released by the Toronto Argonauts, veteran quarterback Matt Nichols signed with the Ottawa Redblacks, who subsequently released Arbuckle.

Toronto Argonauts
On February 1, 2021, it was announced that Arbuckle had signed with the Toronto Argonauts. He made his first start with the Argonauts in week 3 of the 2021 season where he completed 23 passes out of 32 attempts for 310 yards and one touchdown in a win against the Winnipeg Blue Bombers on August 21, 2021. Arbuckle started in the next three games for the Argos, winning once, before being replaced as the starting quarterback by veteran McLeod Bethel-Thompson.

Edmonton Elks 
On October 26, 2021, Arbuckle was traded to the Edmonton Elks in exchange for a third-round pick in the 2022 CFL Draft and the rights to former Ole Miss quarterback Chad Kelly from Edmonton's negotiation list. On November 1, 2021, the Elks announced they had signed Arbuckle to a contract extension through the 2022 season. In early January 2022 the Elks and Arbuckle modified the terms of his contract, with a reported salary of $328,000, a housing allowance of $12,000, and a signing bonus of $100,000. Arbuckle and the Elks struggled to begin the 2022 season, losing their first three games which resulted in Arbuckle being benched in favour of rookie Canadian quarterback Tre Ford and also ceding snaps to Kai Locksley. Arbuckle played in five games for the Elks, completing 74 of 115 pass attempts (64.4%) for 892 yards with two touchdowns and eight interceptions.

Ottawa Redblacks (II)
On July 11, 2022, it was announced that Arbuckle had been traded to the Ottawa Redblacks in exchange for a fourth-round selection in the 2023 CFL Draft. Arbuckle had been acquired by Ottawa in order to compete with Caleb Evans for the starting role while veteran Jeremiah Masoli recovered from a leg injury. Caleb Evans started the first five games after Arbuckle arrived in Ottawa, however with the team having only one victory in nine games head coach Paul LaPolice named Nick Arbuckle as Ottawa's starting quarterback for the club's Week 12 match against his former team Edmonton. Arbuckle completed 21 of 32 pass attempts for 219 yards and was able to guide the Redblacks to their second win of the season. Arbuckle continued as the Redblacks starting quarterback for most of the remainder of the season, however the team saw little success and finished last place in the league with only four wins and 14 losses. On February 5, 2023, nine days before becoming a free agent, Arbuckle and Ottawa agreed on a one-year contract extension. It is expected that he will serve as the backup quarterback in 2023 behind Masoli.

CFL career statistics

References

External links
Ottawa Redblacks profile

1993 births
Living people
American football quarterbacks
American players of Canadian football
Calgary Stampeders players
Canadian football quarterbacks
Edmonton Elks players
Georgia State Panthers football players
Ottawa Redblacks players
People from Camarillo, California
Pierce Brahmas football players
Players of American football from California
Sportspeople from Ventura County, California
Toronto Argonauts players
Players of Canadian football from California